The Georgenberg is a mountain in the middle of the German state of Baden-Württemberg.

The slopes of the Georgenberg were originally used by the inhabitants of Reutlingen and Pfullingen to grow wine, which is why terraced landscape structures can still be seen below the summit.

References

Mountains and hills of Baden-Württemberg